The 1877 Westminster by-election was fought on 11 August 1877.  The byelection was fought due to the incumbent Conservative MP, William Henry Smith, becoming first Lord of the Admiralty.  It was retained by the incumbent.

References

Westminster by-election
Westminster by-election
Westminster,1877
Westminster,1877
Unopposed ministerial by-elections to the Parliament of the United Kingdom in English constituencies
Westminster by-election